The 6th Light Armoured Brigade is one of the eight inter-arm brigades which are at the disposition of the . The headquarters of the brigade is situated in Nîmes. The brigade is capable of deploying to any exterior theatre of operation while delivering fire power, agility, and mobility.

History 
The brigade is heir to the 6th Cavalry Division of 1914, the 6th Light Cavalry Division of 1940, and the 6th Armoured Division, stationed in Compiègne (1951-1957) and then in Strasbourg (1977-1984)

In 1984, the formation was reorganised as the 6th Light Armoured Division (6e DLB) and was part of the Rapid Action Force (1984-1999). The division then was formed of 7 regiments, 5 professionals out which 3 are part of the Foreign Legion:

21st Marine Infantry Regiment, 21e RIMa, which had been part of the 31st Brigade (1981-1984)
 68th Artillery Regiment, 68e RA
 6th Command and Support Regiment, 6e RCS
1st Spahi Regiment, 1er RS
1st Foreign Cavalry Regiment, 1er REC, attached to the 31st Brigade
2nd Foreign Infantry Regiment, 2e REI, a regimental component of the 31st Brigade
6th Foreign Engineer Regiment, 6e REG

Structure in 2007 
Following Army reorganisation in 1999, the division was renamed the 6th Light Armoured Brigade. It consists of 6000 service personnel with 2100 wheeled vehicles, and includes 6 regiments and one transmission company:

21st Marine Infantry Regiment
3rd Marine Artillery Regiment
2nd Foreign Infantry Regiment, 2e REI
1st Spahi Regiment
1st Foreign Cavalry Regiment, 1er REC
1st Foreign Engineer Regiment, 1er REG
6th Command and Support Regiment

It includes significant numbers of the Foreign Legion and Troupes de Marine.

Organization in 2009 
Strong with 6000 service personnel, legionnaires and Troupes de Marine the brigade is composed of:

General H.Q. in  Nîmes
 6th Command and Support Regiment, 6e RCS
21st Marine Infantry Regiment, 21e RIMa
3rd Marine Artillery Regiment, 3e RAMa
2nd Foreign Infantry Regiment, 2e REI
1st Foreign Cavalry Regiment, 1er REC
1st Foreign Engineer Regiment, 1er REG

Organization in 2016 
Mostly manned with troops from the Foreign Legion and Troupes de Marine, the brigade is composed of:

 General H.Q. in Nîmes
 6e Compagnie de Commandement et de Transmissions (6e CCT) - Command and Signals Company in Nîmes with VAB
 1 Régiment de Spahis – Cavalry Regiment in Valence with AMX 10 RC
 1 Régiment Etranger de Cavalerie (1 REC) Foreign Legion - Cavalry Regiment in Marseille with AMX 10 RC
 2e Régiment Etranger d'Infanterie (2e REI) - Foreign Legion Infantry Regiment in Nîmes with VBCI
 13e Demi Brigade de Légion Etrangère (13e DBLE) - Foreign Legion regiment in La Cavalerie with VAB
 21e Régiment d'Infanterie de Marine (21e RIMa) - Marine Infantry Regiment in Fréjus with VAB
 3e Régiment d'Artillerie de Marine (3e RAMa) - Marine Artillery Regiment in Canjuers with TRF1 howitzers, CAESAR self-propelled howitzers and RTF1 mortars
 1 Régiment Étranger de Génie (1 REG) - Foreign Legion Engineer Regiment in Laudun

Division & Brigade Commanders

(1984 - 1999) 

1984 - 1986 : général de division Moreau
1986 - 1988 : général de brigade Favreau
1988 - 1990 : général de brigade Pincemin
1990 - 1991 : général de brigade Mouscardès
1991 - 1993 : général de division Bernard Janvier
1993 - 1994 : général de division Bâton
1994 - 1996 : général de division Rideau
1996 - 1999 : général de brigade Schwrdorffer

(1999 - present) 
 1999 - 2000: général de brigade Barro
 2000 - 2002: général de brigade de Kermabon
 2002 – 2004: général de brigade Bruno Dary
 2006 – 2008: général de brigade Bertrand Clément-Bollée
 2008 – 2010: général de brigade Eric Margail
 2010 – 2012: général de brigade Antoine Windeck
 2012 – 2014: général de brigade Laurent Kolodziej
 2014 – 2016: général de brigade Pierre Gillet
 2016 - 2017: général de brigade Benoît Durieux
 2017 - 2019: général de brigade Franck Nicol
 2019 - 2021: général de brigade Jean-Christophe Bechon
 2021 -  : général de brigade Eric Ozanne

See also 
French Navy

References

External links
 6e DLB Official site
 Page de la 6° BLB sur le site du ministère français de la Défense
 servir-et-defendre.com L'ordre de bataille de la force terrestre.

1999 establishments in France
Brigades of France
Military units and formations established in 1999